Farrah Hall (born November 1, 1981 in Annapolis, Maryland) is an American sports sailor. She competes in RS:X, a windsurfing discipline.

Hall graduated from Broadneck High School in Annapolis in 1999 and from St. Mary's College of Maryland in 2003 with a B.A. in Biology.

At the 2012 Summer Olympics, she competed in the women's sailboard (RS:X). She finished 20th.

She has qualified to represent the United States at the 2020 Summer Olympics.

References

External links
 
 
 
 
 

1981 births
Living people
American female sailors (sport)
Olympic sailors of the United States
Sailors at the 2012 Summer Olympics – RS:X
Sailors at the 2020 Summer Olympics – RS:X
Pan American Games bronze medalists for the United States
Pan American Games medalists in sailing
Sailors at the 2011 Pan American Games
Medalists at the 2011 Pan American Games
Sportspeople from Annapolis, Maryland
St. Mary's Seahawks sailors
21st-century American women
American windsurfers
Female windsurfers